Raymar is a given name. Notable people with the name include:

 Raymar Jose (born 1992), Filipino basketball player
 Raymar Morgan (born 1988), American basketball player
 Raymar Reimers (born 1940), German boxer

Masculine given names